Sandra Aguilar Navarro (born 9 August 1992 in Madrid)  is a Spanish group rhythmic gymnast.

Career 
Sandra Aguilar represents her nation at international competitions. She participated at the 2012 Summer Olympics. She competed at world championships, including at the 2013 World Rhythmic Gymnastics Championships winning the gold medal in the 10 clubs event and the bronze medal in the 3 Balls + 2 Ribbons event. and at the 2015 World Rhythmic Gymnastics Championships where she won the bronze medal in the all-around event.

Aguilar competed at the 2016 Summer Olympics in Rio de Janeiro, Brazil where she was member of the Spanish group (together with Elena López, Artemi Gavezou, Lourdes Mohedano, Alejandra Quereda) that won silver medal in group-all around.

Detailed Olympic results

References

External links
 
 
 
 
 

1992 births
Living people
Spanish rhythmic gymnasts
Gymnasts at the 2012 Summer Olympics
Olympic gymnasts of Spain
Gymnasts at the 2015 European Games
European Games competitors for Spain
Gymnasts at the 2016 Summer Olympics
Medalists at the Rhythmic Gymnastics World Championships
Medalists at the Rhythmic Gymnastics European Championships
Olympic silver medalists for Spain